Sainte-Sévère-sur-Indre (literally Sainte-Sévère on Indre) is a commune in the Indre department in central France.

It is situated near the source of the river Indre.  The town has a population today of approximately 770 (2018).

The town was featured in the movie Jour de fête (1949) by Jacques Tati, which tells of a small amusement fair in a town and of the adventures of a rural postman. The fairground scenes were shot in the old town square, and many of the local inhabitants were given roles as extras.

Population

See also
Communes of the Indre department

References

Communes of Indre